Bleed American is the fourth studio album by American rock band Jimmy Eat World, released on July 24, 2001, by DreamWorks Records. The album was re-released as Jimmy Eat World following the September 11 attacks; that name remained until 2008, when it was re-released with its original title returned.

Following the commercial failure and lack of recognition for their third studio album Clarity (1999) from Capitol Records, Jimmy Eat World were dropped by the label in late 1999. Aside from working odd jobs, the band toured to raise money for their next album. It was recorded with Mark Trombino and the band served as producers in October and November 2000 at the Cherokee and Harddrive studios in Los Angeles, respectively. The musical style was more direct and accessible than its predecessor, with simpler chord structures.

"Bleed American" was released to radio on June 5, 2001 as the album's lead single, coinciding with Jimmy Eat World's tours of Australia and Japan (the latter supporting Eastern Youth). After appearing on the East Coast dates of the Warped Tour, the band supported Blink-182 and Weezer. "The Middle" was released as a single on November 19, 2001. The band went on a headlining European tour in early 2002, followed by a Japanese tour, leading up to a two-month support slot for Blink-182 and Green Day on their Pop Disaster Tour. "Sweetness" was released as the third single on June 3, 2002. The band supported Incubus in Australia, before embarking on headlining tours of the UK and the US. "A Praise Chorus" was released as a promotional single during 2002.

Each single from Bleed American entered the top twenty of at least one US chart. The most successful was "The Middle", which reached number one on the Billboard Modern Rock Tracks chart and number five on the Billboard Hot 100. In August2002, Bleed American was certified platinum by the Recording Industry Association of America after its sales reached over one million copies. As of September2016, the album has sold over 1.6million copies in the US. Bleed American appeared on several publications' best-of-the-year album lists, by the likes of Addicted to Noise, CMJ and Kerrang!, as well as all-time lists by publications such as Consequence of Sound, NME and Spin.

Background
In February1999, Jimmy Eat World released their third studio album, Clarity, through Capitol Records. Frontman Jim Adkins recalled that the label was disorganized at the time, due to having a new president and new people in charge of each department. As a result, any trust the band had within the company had dissipated. Capitol began to shelve the album until radio stations started playing the song "Lucky Denver Mint", which became its second track. The release of the album marked the end of their two-record deal with the label, which was made official in August1999. Drummer Zach Lind recalled that the label "really didn't believe in us. But in a way, that was sort of a good thing, because it let us take control of what we needed to do. We learned we had to do it ourselves, because no one else would do it for us."

Due to a lack of funds, the members had taken up odd jobs: Adkins sold art supplies; Linton did construction work; Burch sold auto parts; and Lind worked at a car dealership. In August2000, Jimmy Eat World released the compilation album Singles through the independent label Big Wheel Recreation, which included B-sides and unreleased songs from the band up to that point. They went on a five-week tour of Europe; they bought copies of their previous releases from Capitol at cost value to sell them directly in that territory. The band's management were against the idea of this tour as they lacked a foothold in the United States. They decided to break away with their management to work as free agents. The tour was ultimately considered a success by the band, with Clarity selling 500copies a week by that point. After this, they released a split EP with Jebediah in September2000.

Recording
Bleed American was produced by Mark Trombino and Jimmy Eat World. Trombino had already produced two of the band's previous studio albums: Static Prevails (1996) and Clarity (1999). He had struck up a brotherly relationship with the band; he reacted positively to the demos that Adkins had played him. The sales from Singles and the proceeds from Jimmy Eat World's European tour helped fund the album's recording sessions, but the money budgeted for the record was insufficient. Trombino offered to work for free until after the album's production, confident he would be reimbursed by the album's predicted commercial success. Recording sessions took place in Los Angeles, California in October2000. Clark Robertson, who had been in a band that Linton saw live, rented equipment on the band's behalf.

The drums were recorded at Cherokee Studios in Los Angeles, which proved costly to the group. The band took a brief break to tour with Jebediah for two-and-a-half weeks, including a performance at CMJ New Music Marathon festival, before returning to Los Angeles. To save money, sessions moved to Harddrive in North Hollywood, where they did overdubs over the course of a month and a half from November2000. Partway through, at the suggestion of Trombino, the band uploaded demo versions of songs on the music platform Napster for fans to hear. By this point, artists and repertoire (A&R) people from various labels visited the band, often unannounced. As a result of this, they had to lock the doors to keep people out. The album was mixed at South Ecstasy Recording Studio, also in Los Angeles, in January2001. As Lind was writing a check to cover the cost of mixing, he was worried they were close to bankruptcy, and hoped it would not bounce.

Lyrical themes and musical style

Overview
The material on Bleed American was more accessible and aggressive than its predecessor Clarity, which had a more "layered, sprawling sound." We wanted to really make sure that we weren't doing things, like, just to put a wacky keyboard sound in. It had to be doing something constructive for the song." They intentionally strayed away from the complex writing of Clarity for simpler structures. "Hear You Me" and "My Sundown" were initially intended for Go Big Casino, Adkin's orchestral side project. Critics have described the genres of the album as alternative rock, emo pop, pop-punk and power pop. According to Adkins, the band called the album Bleed American as it and the title-track dealt with "chang[ing] one's lie for the better", and as such that theme "runs throughout the entire album". He also stated that people "all too often get caught up with things they don't really need. America just needs to be a strong bloodletting process".

The lyrical composition in Bleed American also remained rather direct and straightforward in comparison to Clarity. Mark Vanderhoff of AllMusic said that Bleed American didn't have any "16 minute songs," referencing "Goodbye Sky Harbor" from Clarity. Rather, he called the music on Bleed American "just straight-ahead rock & roll, performed with punk energy and alt-rock smarts." Author Andy Greenwald said the album dealt with self-medication, "more specifically the Jim Adkins Diet—where music, any music, equals salvation". He noted that the majority of the songs on the album are sung from a second-person perspective. Towards the end of touring in support of Clarity, Adkins began having what he thought was a heart attack. It was later revealed to be a panic attack, for which he had to take medication; the incident inspired some of the lyrics throughout the album. Rachel Haden (of That Dog) lent her voice in "Hear You Me", "If You Don't, Don't", "Cautioners" and "My Sundown".

Songs

Adkins said "Bleed American" is about how trivial things in a person's life can overtake more important things. The grunge-esque track has been compared to the work of Helmet, At the Drive-In and Braid. Journalist Alex Rice felt that its loud-quiet structure and lyrics about the disillusionment of youth recalled "Thinking, That's All", the opening track from Static Prevails. When writing "A Praise Chorus", the band were stuck on the bridge section; they sent it to Davey von Bohlen (of the Promise Ring) who wrote a bridge referencing various songs, including "Crimson and Clover" by Tommy James and the Shondells, "Our House" by Madness, "Kickstart My Heart" by Mötley Crüe and "Don't Let's Start" by They Might Be Giants. Throughout "A Praise Chorus", which deals with nostalgia, Adkins employs a vocal stutter. The new wave-esque "The Middle" includes a guitar solo that, according to Adkins, was a homage to Doug Gillard of Guided by Voices and their song "I Am a Tree". Its lyrics speak about "fitting in" and self-acceptance; Adkins wrote the song in response to an email from a fan who felt they were "not punk enough". Lind said his drums on the song were an attempt to emulate the ones heard in "You Wreck Me" by Tom Petty.

"Your House" details the pain of a break-up, cutting all communication with the person, and is reminiscent of the work of Versus. The drum parts were played in unison by Lind, Adkins and Trombino, as Lind wanted something similar to a marching band. "Sweetness" was one of the songs that Adkins had more doubts about because of its lyrical content: "I just had this melody in my head and I was demoing it and singing it and kind of having a hard time with it. I almost didn't bring it to the band because I was thinking to myself, ’I can't just say nothing. I can't just use all these sort of alyrical whoahs for this much of a song.’" The whoah vocalizations were intended as a placeholder for other lyrics, though as the members were unable to come up with anything else, the parts remained. The drum beat was done in the style of U2 drummer Larry Mullen Jr.; it incorporates influences from post-hardcore and second-wave emo. A demo version of the tune was recorded during the Clarity sessions, though Capitol Records did not think much of the track, so the band scrapped it.

"Hear You Me" is a tribute to Mykel and Carli Allan, two popular Weezer fans, who died in a car accident while returning home after a concert. The guitarwork uses a countermelody against the vocals; it  includes a piano, organ, horns and Haden's vocals. "Hear You Me" was featured in the 2004 romantic comedy A Cinderella Story and in the TV series One Tree Hill. 

"If You Don't, Don't" tackles the theme of lost love; the guitars were initially much faster in the style of the Wedding Present, until Adkins slowed it down. "Get It Faster" opens with a minute of drum fills, which were programmed in the PlayStation game MTV Music Generator.  "Cautioners" is a five-minute electropop song that meshes electronica and rock. It channels the sound of the Cars  and recalls the quieter songs on Clarity. An earlier version of the track, released on a split EP with Jebediah, was centered around guitar strums. The version on the album features heavy use of decay, which Adkins said sounded "computerized". The drums were made up of several loops that were made at Cherokee, done over the course of a few days. The title and lyrics of "The Authority Song" are a direct reference to "Authority Song" by John Cougar Mellencamp, and it also contains a reference to Automatic, an album by the Jesus and Mary Chain. It deals with being half-open  with a person one is not too familiar with. The album concludes with the ballad "My Sundown".

Release
DreamWorks Records' A&R member Luke Wood monitored the band's potential from when they became free agents and offered to help them. Wood had previously been in the band Sammy, who opened for Jimmy Eat World during the 1990s, and was adamant about signing them after hearing "A Praise Chorus". Jimmy Eat World considered Wood's help, but it was not until a year later when they returned to contact him. By then, the industry hype behind the forthcoming album caused a bidding war between labels. The band met with various staff members from six labels in Los Angeles and New York City in March2001, before signing to DreamWorks in the following month. Lind said the label had a solid working relationship with their artists, "[t]hey understand what a career is, like how fragile it is." Capitol Records had unsuccessfully tried to re-sign the band after hearing the finished album; the band said they would have a meeting if the label would give them their master recordings back.

Soon afterwards, the band enlisted a new booking agent and co-managers Gary Gersh and John Silva; they knew Gersh from when he was CEO at Capitol a few years prior. Despite these new representatives, Lind continued acting as the band's de facto manager, a role he had been doing for two years by that point. Bleed American was made available for streaming on July 19, 2001, before being released five days later. The album artwork, showing a set of bowling trophies sitting on top of a cigarette machine, is taken from William Eggleston's photograph "Memphis". Adkins was a fan of Eggleston, going as far as to dub him the "father of color photography". Out of concern that its title could be misinterpreted following the September 11 attacks, the album was re-released with an eponymous title in December2001, despite the band initially saying that they would not change its name. The decision was ultimately the band's, which was supported by their label; instead of recalling existing copies, they simply had the name amended with subsequent pressings of the album. In addition, the title-track was renamed "Salt Sweat Sugar" and reissued on December 11, 2001.

Singles and EPs
"Bleed American" was released to radio on June 5, 2001, and released as a physical single on August 21, 2001. The US 7" vinyl version included a demo of "Your House", while the German CD edition featured, demos of "Your House" and "The Authority Song", alongside "(Splash) Turn Twist" and the music video for "Bleed American" (directed by Ross Richardson).

"The Middle" was released as a single on November 19, 2001. The UK 7" vinyl included a radio session version of "A Praise Chorus" as its B-side, while the European CD featured "No Sensitivity" and demos of "The Middle" and "My Sundown". Another CD version, which saw release in Europe and the US featured radio sessions versions of "If You Don't, Don't" and "Game of Pricks", as well as the music video for "The Middle". The video was directed by Paul Fedor, who based it on an episode of The Brady Bunch. The video features the band at a party performing in a living room to a crowd of people in their underwear. The protagonist, played by Josh Keleher, arrives at the party fully clothed; he eventually undressed in a closet, helping a girl undress as well.

"Sweetness" was released as a single on June 3, 2002; the UK 7" vinyl version included a live version of "Clarity" as its B-side. Two CD versions were released in Europe: the first with live versions of "Blister" and "Your New Aesthetic", while the other included live versions of "If You Don't, Don't", "Lucky Denver Mint" and "Blister". The music video for "Sweetness" shows the band stationary as the world is altered around them; it was filmed in Los Angeles, with director Tim Hope. Lind said the video was "loosely based on a general journey of what a band goes through as they start and as they progress". "A Praise Chorus" was released as a promotional single in 2002.

In addition to the album's singles, two EPs were released to support Bleed American. The first of these EPs, titled Good to Go EP, was released on February 22, 2002, exclusively in Japan, and featured "Spangle", "The Most Beautiful Things", an acoustic version of "The Middle", a radio session version of "Game of Pricks", an early version of "Cautioners" and live versions of "A Praise Chorus" and "Softer". The second EP, titled The Middle/A Praise Chorus Tour EP, was a tour EP released in Australia in January2003, consisting of "The Middle", "A Praise Chorus", "Firestarter", an acoustic version of "The Middle" and a live version of "Bleed American".

Subsequent events and releases
Bleed American was initially released on vinyl through Grand Royal Records; when that label folded, it was re-pressed through Adkins' own label Western Tread in 2003. In October2003, the band released the Believe in What You Want video album, which chronicled the making-of and release of Bleed American. On April 28, 2008, a deluxe edition of the album was released with a bonus disc containing several B-sides, acoustic versions, live versions, demo versions and previously unreleased tracks. The original album and track title Bleed American were restored for this release. This edition was pressed on vinyl in 2011 as part of Record Store Day. Later that year, the band performed Bleed American and Clarity in their entireties for two UK shows.

Touring
Following two one-off US shows in February2001, Jimmy Eat World embarked on a two-week tour in Germany. In June2001, the band then went on a tour of Australia and Japan, the latter being a supporting slot for Eastern Youth. After they made their second appearance on Warped Tour, where they played the East Coast shows in July and August2001, they supported Blink-182 and Weezer. The band then appeared on The Late Late Show with Craig Kilborn (around which, the band played three shows in Los Angeles) and the Late Show with David Letterman, and performed at Edgefest II in Canada. They supported Weezer on their Extended Midget Tour in the US to close out the year; Jimmy Eat World were augmented by touring musicians Brian McMahan (of the For Carnation) on sampler, keyboards and guitar and Haden on backing vocals. Alongside this, the band performed on Late Night with Conan O'Brien. In January and February2002, the band were due to support Blink-182 on their tour of Europe; however, when that band postponed, Jimmy Eat World embarked on a headlining European tour instead.

After returning to the US, Jimmy Eat World played four shows in the southern states, before traveling to Japan, where they played until March2002. The band supported Blink-182 and Green Day on their co-headlining US Pop Disaster Tour in April and May2002, which coincided with appearances on Saturday Night Live and The Tonight Show with Jay Leno. Following this, Jimmy Eat World supported Incubus on their headlining tour of Australia, before going on their own tour of the UK with support from the Promise Ring, and playing a series of US festivals and Canadian shows. Preceded by an appearance on the Late Show with David Letterman, they embarked on a headlining US tour, with support from Desaparecidos, Recover and the Promise Ring. Following this, the band performed at the Reading and Leeds Festivals in the UK. In September and October, the band performed at This Ain't No Picnic festival and on two dates of the Plea for Peace/Take Action Tour, in addition to an appearance on Last Call with Carson Daly.

Reception

Original reviews 

Bleed American was met with generally favorable reviews from music critics. Several reviewers discussed the album's emo stylings. While noting that those who dislike "emo or 'poppier' music" would dislike the album, Aubin Paul of Punknews.org said that "the punker-than-thou kids should stick with Static Prevails, but a catalog as impressive a J.E.W.'s can be appreciated by anyone without preconceptions." Rolling Stone reviewer Barry Walters added to this, stating that it "sports the tender turbulence that insular emo kids have been enjoying in private for years," with the album appealing to fans of Creed and Blink-182 as well as new wave music. The staff at Entertainment Weekly observed the album as a "fine balancing act" of "emo-edged" tracks and "wallop-packed rockers", though Joe Warminsky III of The Morning Call disregarded the emo elements, describing it instead as a genuine rock record.

Multiple reviewers, including those at Allmusic, Drowned in Sound, and USA Today, praised the songwriting quality and guitarwork; these included remarks on "catchy melodies", "bouncy rhythms" and "a tacklebox of hooks". NME writer Imran Ahmed said it was a "veritable pop-buzzsaw, rammed to its back teeth with infectious melodies and teen TV sentiment". Paul stated that unlike the band's prior albums, the second half of Bleed American was "quite strong, and really fleshes out the musical ideas from the record". Greenwald said in comparison to Clarity, which "goes inward in search of salvation," Bleed American was "outgoing, boisterous, confident". Blender, on the other hand, was less pleased as the album's mainstream potential was "undercut by guitars, which are neither as gleefully blaring as Weezer's nor as cleanly melodic as the Knack's."

Other reviewers were mixed on the album's mature stance. Steve Hochman of the Los Angeles Times commented that listeners "graduating from teen tastes could well turn to this album as a first step to adulthood", while Robert Christgau of The Village Voice stated "if this band can't be maturity's answer to 'N Sync, it can be patriotism's answer to Travis."  Aaron Scott of Slant Magazine believed the maturity the band showed through the album was capable of attracting a wide-ranging audience. Pitchfork Ryan Schreiber gave a much more negative and sarcastic review of the album, concluding, "So do the best you can, listen to your favorite band, bury your head in the sand, before it all begins again. Hey, I just wrote a Jimmy Eat World song!"

Retrospective reviews

Retrospective reviews of Bleed American continued to praise the album's songwriting quality.  Thomas Nassiff of AbsolutePunk opined that the album contained "no bad songs", concluding: "Certainly one of the most memorable records of 2001, Bleed American might actually have the most lasting power of any album from that class." Mike Stagno of Sputnikmusic found Bleed American enjoyable, and noted its high replay value, particularly tracks such as "Sweetness" and "Get It Faster".

Louder Than War writer Sam Lambeth saw the album as a "hallmark of modern rock, a faultless record that may wear its heart on its sleeve, but elevates in its earnestness". Punknews.org staff member Brian Shultz reviewed the deluxe edition, and found the album's content to still be strong despite its age. On the other hand, PopMatters Charles A. Hohman found "little insight or revelation [on the deluxe edition]." A guest writer for Tiny Mix Tapes said the album's strongest points were the "stripped down" tracks.

Commercial performance
Bleed American was a commercial success, helping Jimmy Eat World gain mainstream popularity. It sold 30,000copies in its first week of release. It peaked at number 54 on the Billboard 200 on August 11, 2001; the renamed version peaked at number 31 in July2002. Outside the US, the album peaked at number 20 in Germany, number 43 in New Zealand, number 54 in Australia, and number 62 in the UK.

Bleed American became a bestseller, and in its first four months on the US market, it sold 173,000copies, making the album Jimmy Eat World's most successful release. Lind said that these sales were "definitely a big deal to the band because it shows how the fanbase is growing. [If you're] doing anything creative, you want more and more people to enjoy what you do." It was certified gold in the US by the Recording Industry Association of America (RIAA) in March 2002, and it reached platinum status five months later. Alongside this, the album was certified platinum in Canada by the Canadian Recording Industry Association (CRIA), and Silver by the British Phonographic Industry (BPI) in the UK.  As of September 2016, Bleed American has sold over 1.6 million copies in the US.

"The Middle" reached number five on the US Billboard Hot 100. It also charted at number one on Alternative Songs, number two on Adult Pop Songs, number four on Pop Songs, number five on Radio Songs, number 39 on Mainstream Rock Songs and number 44 on Rock Digital Songs. Outside the US, it charted at number 26 in the UK, where it was certified platinum, number 28 in New Zealand, number 29 in Scotland, number 49 in Australia, number 92 in the Netherlands, and number 98 in France.

"Bleed American" peaked at number 16 on Alternative Songs. It also charted at number 59 in Scotland and number 60 in the UK. "Sweetness" peaked at number 75 on the Billboard Hot 100, number two on Alternative Songs, number 40 on Adult Pop Songs, and number 74 on Radio Songs. Outside the US, it charted at number 31 in Scotland and number 38 in the UK.  "A Praise Chorus" peaked at number 16 Alternative Songs.

Accolades and legacy
Greenwald said Bleed American being certified platinum was one factor in emo reaching mainstream media attention in mid-2002, alongside Vagrant Records having significant sales figures on its releases and Dashboard Confessional appearing on MTV Unplugged. In addition, Jimmy Eat World became the first emo act to have significant success at radio and on the charts. Greenwald mentioned that with Bleed American being their "poppiest, most universal album to date," the band "broke out of the indie/emo ghetto, but by doing so, they also defined its sound 'as' emo for hundreds of thousands of new listeners". My Chemical Romance worked with Trombino for a test session for Three Cheers for Sweet Revenge (2004) as the members loved Bleed American. Five of the album's songs were covered by Australian acts for the tribute album Sing It Back: A Tribute to Jimmy Eat World (2015).

Q listed Bleed American as one of the best 50 albums of 2001, while Consequence of Sound ranked it at number nine on their list of the top 10 albums of the year. The album was included in Rock Sounds 101 Modern Classics list at number 48. In 2013, it was ranked at number 429 on NMEs The 500 Greatest Albums of All Time list. The publication also listed the album as one of "20 Pop Punk Albums Which Will Make You Nostalgic", as well as one of "20 Emo Albums That Have Resolutely Stood The Test Of Time". The album was ranked at number 183 on Spins "The 300 Best Albums of the Past 30 Years (1985–2014)" list. In 2017, Rolling Stone ranked it at number 25 on their list of the 50 Greatest Pop-Punk Albums. "Sweetness" appeared on a best-of emo songs list by Vulture. "A Praise Chorus", "Bleed American", "The Middle" and "Sweetness" were ranked at numbers 85, 12, 9 and 3, respectively, on Alternative Press list of the best 100 singles from the 2000s.

Track listing
All songs written by Jimmy Eat World, except "A Praise Chorus", which contains lyrics from various songs.Bonus tracksPersonnel
Personnel per 2008 reissue booklet.Jimmy Eat World Jim Adkins – lead vocals, lead guitar, percussion; bass guitar (track 4); piano (tracks 6 and 11); organ (tracks 9 and 11), bells (track 11)
 Rick Burch – bass guitar, backing vocals, gang vocals (track 7)
 Zach Lind – drums; percussion (tracks 4 and 11)
 Tom Linton – rhythm guitar, backing vocals, gang vocals (track 1); organ (track 6)Additional musicians Davey von Bohlen – additional vocals (track 2)
 Mark Trombino – synth emulator programming (track 3); percussion (track 4); programming (tracks 8 and 11); "magic box" (track 9)
 Travis Keller, Doug Messenger – "timely handclaps" (track 10)
 Rachel Haden – additional vocals (tracks 6, 7, 9 and 11); uncredited back-up vocals (track 10)
 Ariel Rechtshaid – additional vocals (track 7)Production Mark Trombino – producer, engineer, mixing
 Jimmy Eat World – producer
 Justin Smith – assistant engineer
 William Eggleston – front cover photograph
 Christopher Wray-McCann – photography
 Jim Adkins – art direction
 Jeff Kleinsmith – art direction, design
 Jesse LeDoux – designDeluxe edition production Dana G. Smart – supervisor
 Jimmy Eat World, Dana Smart, Luke Wood – compilers
 Pat Lawrence – executive producer
 Ted Jensen – mastering
 Vartan – art direction
 Coco Shinomiya – design
 Ryan Null – photo coordination
 Monique McGuffin Newman – production manager

 Charts 

 Weekly charts 

 Year-end charts 

 Certifications 

Notes

ReferencesCitationsSources'

See also
List of entertainment affected by the September 11 attacks

External links

Bleed American (deluxe edition) at YouTube (streamed copy where licensed)

2001 albums
Jimmy Eat World albums
DreamWorks Records albums
Albums produced by Mark Trombino